Andrea Lanzano (1651 in Milan – 1709) was an Italian painter of the late Baroque period.

He was initially trained in Milan under Luigi Scaramuccia, then traveled to Rome to work under Carlo Maratta. He became a follower of Giovanni Lanfranco. He was commissioned to help paint ceiling of the entry staircase of the palace of Hans-Adam I, Prince of Liechtenstein in Vienna. He was knighted by the emperor of the Austrian Empire.

References

17th-century Italian painters
Italian male painters
18th-century Italian painters
Italian Baroque painters
Painters from Milan
1651 births
1709 deaths
18th-century Italian male artists